This is a List of notable alumni of Barker College, they being notable former students or alumni of the Anglican Church school, Barker College in Hornsby, New South Wales, Australia. The alumni may elect to join the school's alumni association, the Old Barker Association (OBA), formed in 1908, and was originally known as the 'Barker College Old Boys Union'. The OBA provides a link between Barker College and its past students, with in excess of 16,500 members.

Media, entertainment and the arts
 David Astlecryptic crossword compiler: "DA"
 Anna Bamfordactor, Wonderland
 Andrew BevisLondon West End actor
 John Blackwood, 11th Baron Dufferin and Claneboye, Australian architect
 Mike Carltonretired radio presenter
 Simon Fieldhouseartist
 Jarod Greenfounder, The Handsomity Institute and director/creator of the TV series Beached Az
 Takaya Hondaactor, Neighbours and The Family Law
 Hugo Johnstone-Burtactor, San Andreas
 Chris Lilleycomedian and actor, Summer Heights High
 Nick Littlemoreproducer and musician, as a member of Pnau and Empire Of The Sun (band)
Peter Mayesproducer and musician, as a member of Pnau and main producer of Empire Of The Sun (band)
 Sam Littlemoreproducer and musician, as a member of Pnau and also known as Sam La More and Tonite Only
 Simon MarnieABC radio presenter
 Penny McNameeactor, Home and Away
 Phillip Noycefilm director
 Rosie Waterlandbestselling author and television writer, The Anti Cool Girl, Every Lie I've Ever Told
 James Westjournalist, executive producer of Hack on Triple J
 Brian Wilshire (1957–1961) retired radio presenter

Politics, public service, business and the law
 John Blaxland historian and academic at The Australian National University
 Mitch Fifield Senator for Victoria (2004-2019), representing the Liberals
 Peter Garrett  Midnight Oil lead singer; environmentalist; former Member for Kingsford-Smith, representing Labor, former federal Minister for School Education, Early Childhood and Youth
 Rob Oakeshottformer independent Member for Lyne and Member for Clarence, formerly representing the Nationals
 Philip Ruddock former Member for Parramatta (1973-1977), former Member for Dundas (1977-1993), former Member for Berowra (1993-2016), former Minister for Immigration, Multicultural and Indigenous Affairs (1996-2003) and former Attorney-General (2003-2007), and Mayor of Hornsby Shire Council since 2017, representing the Liberals
 John Blaxland historian and academic at The Australian National University* Robert Solomonformer Member for Denison, representing the Liberals, and 1955 NSW Rhodes Scholar
 Bo Seo, author, journalist and world champion debater

Science, medicine and technology
 Douglas Armatiwriter, researcher and consultant with management expertise in the protection of digital intellectual property
 James Angusbiomedical researcher
 Craig Barratttechnology executive
 Chris Heydestatistician, fellow of the Australian Academy of Science
 Andrew Tridgellcreator of and contributor to the Samba software file server for linking Windows clients and Unix file server systems, and co-inventor of the rsync algorithm
 Jeff Waughsoftware developer

Sport
 Alex BlackwellAustralian and NSW women's cricketer
 Kate BlackwellAustralian and NSW women's cricketer
 Jamie BrazierPapua New Guinean cricketer
 Brendon Cookinternational race car driver
 Ben Darwinformer Wallaby
 Sue Fear mountaineer, first Australian woman to climb Mount Everest, died in 2006 while climbing
 Sam FiggFormer professional rugby player for the Australian 7s team and the Glendale Raptors
 Richard Harryformer Wallaby
 Alyssa HealyAustralian and NSW woman's cricketer
 Isaiya Katoa NRL Rugby League player
 Melissa Mitchell Swimmer at the 2004 Athens Olympics
 Timothy Myers Australia freestyle & big mountain skier
 Nigel NuttAustralian Commonwealth fencer
 Mitchell Pearcecurrent Newcastle Knights and NSW State of Origin halfback.
 Hugh PyleMelbourne Rebels lock
 Billy PollardProfessional Rugby Union Player for the ACT Brumbies
 Tim Reidironman
 Luke ReimerProfessional Rugby Union Player for the ACT Brumbies
 Amy Sayera football player and member of the Matildas
 Cameron Shepherdformer NSW Waratahs, Western Force and Wallaby fullback
 Lisa SthalekarAustralian and NSW women's cricketer
 Peter Taylorformer Australian Test and limited-overs cricketer
 Ben WhittakerWestern Force, Biarritz Olympique and Melbourne Rebels rugby union player. Now coaches The NSW Waratahs in the Super W Competition as well as NSW Gen blue teams  
Jarrod WittsGold Coast Suns co-captain & club champion

See also

 Combined Associated Schools

References

External links
 Barker College

Barker College
Barker College alumni
Barker College
Barker College alumnae
Barker College alumni
 *